Alexander Chernikov (born September 8, 1984) is a Russian professional ice hockey forward who is currently an unrestricted free agent. He most recently played for HC Neftekhimik Nizhnekamsk of the Kontinental Hockey League (KHL).

After two seasons with Lokomotiv Yaroslavl, Chernikov opted to return to hometown club, HC Lada Togliatti on a one-year contract for the 2014–15 season on August 20, 2014.

As a free agent from Traktor Chelyabinsk following the 2017–18 season, Chernikov agreed to a one-year deal with Admiral Vladivostok on July 13, 2018.

References

External links

1984 births
Living people
Admiral Vladivostok players
Avangard Omsk players
HC CSK VVS Samara players
HC Lada Togliatti players
Lokomotiv Yaroslavl players
HC Neftekhimik Nizhnekamsk players
Russian ice hockey forwards
HC Sibir Novosibirsk players
Sportspeople from Tolyatti
Traktor Chelyabinsk players